Shanxi Sports Centre Stadium is a multi-purpose stadium in Taiyuan, Shanxi, China. It is currently used mostly for association football matches. The stadium holds 62,000 spectators.

References

External links
 Stadium picture

Football venues in China
Multi-purpose stadiums in China
Sports venues in Shanxi
Buildings and structures in Taiyuan
Sports venues completed in 2011
2011 establishments in China